Jiří Kulhánek (born 8 March 1996) is a Czech footballer who last played for Dukla Prague on loan from Sparta Prague as a defensive midfielder.

Club career

Slovan Liberec
Kulhánek made his professional debut for Slovan Liberec against Fastav Zlín on  30 July 2017.

Honours 
Spartak Trnava
 Slovnaft Cup: 2018–19

References

External links
 FC Slovan Liberec official club profile
 
 

1996 births
Living people
Footballers from Prague
Czech footballers
Czech expatriate footballers
Association football midfielders
FC Slovan Liberec players
AC Sparta Prague players
Czech First League players
FC Spartak Trnava players
Slovak Super Liga players
SK Dynamo České Budějovice players
Expatriate footballers in Slovakia
Czech expatriate sportspeople in Slovakia
Czech National Football League players
FK Mladá Boleslav players
FC Sellier & Bellot Vlašim players
SFC Opava players
FK Dukla Prague players